John Bell Gourlay (July 26, 1872 – April 7, 1949) was a Canadian amateur soccer player who competed in the 1904 Summer Olympics. He was born  in Ontario and died in North Vancouver. In 1904 he was a captain of the Galt F.C. team, which won the gold medal in the soccer tournament. He played all two matches as a defender.

References

External links
profile

1872 births
1949 deaths
Canadian soccer players
Canadian people of Scottish descent
Association football defenders
Footballers at the 1904 Summer Olympics
Olympic gold medalists for Canada
Olympic soccer players of Canada
Soccer people from Ontario
Olympic medalists in football
Medalists at the 1904 Summer Olympics
20th-century Canadian people